Camusteel is a remote crofting and former fishing village in the Applecross peninsula, located less than 1 mile directly south of Applecross village, on the west coast of Strathcarron, Ross-shire, Scottish Highlands and is in the Scottish council area of Highland.

References

Populated places in Ross and Cromarty